The Oregon State Beavers college football team represents Oregon State University in the Pacific 12 Conference (Pac-12). The Beavers compete as part of the NCAA Division I Football Bowl Subdivision. The program has had 29 head coaches and one interim head coaches since it began play during the 1893 season. Since November 2017, Jonathan Smith has served as head coach at Oregon State.

Five coaches have led Oregon State in postseason bowl games: Lon Stiner, Tommy Prothro, Dennis Erickson, Mike Riley, and Jonathan Smith. Three of those coaches also won conference championships: Stiner captured one and Prothro two as a member of the Pacific Coast Conference; Prothro captured one as a member of the Athletic Association of Western Universities; and Erickson captured one as a member of the Pacific-10.

Stiner and Riley are tied as leader in seasons coached with 14 years as head coach of the program. Riley has the most all-time wins with 93 and Will Bloss has the highest winning percentage at 0.909. Cory Hall has the lowest winning percentage of those who have coached more than one game, with 0.000. Of the 29 different head coaches who have led the Beavers, Prothro and Erickson have been inducted into the College Football Hall of Fame.

Key

Coaches

Notes

References

Oregon State

Oregon State Beavers football coaches